List of Australian films of 1993 contains a detailed list of films created in Australia in 1993.

1993

See also 
 1993 in Australia
 1993 in Australian television

References

External links 
 Australian film at the Internet Movie Database

1993
Australian
Films